Prince Linval Reuben Mathilda Rajcomar (born 25 April 1985) is a Curaçaoan professional footballer who plays as a forward for Kozakken Boys. At international level, he represented the Curaçao national team, scoring three goals in nine appearances.

Club career

Early career
Prince made his debut for Fortuna Sittard against FC Eindhoven on 16 August 2002. He then went on to play for FC Utrecht and Den Bosch.

Years in Iceland
On 27 February 2007, Rajcomar signed a one-year contract with Icelandic club Breiðablik. At the end of the 2007 season he signed a two-year contract extension with Breidablik. Valur, then champions of Iceland, made an approach to sign Rajcomar during the 2008 transfer window, but Breiðablik declined, saying he was not for sale.

Rajcomar lost his place in the Breiðablik side in the second half of the 2008 season, and has been linked with a move away from the club.

In October 2008, he joined Swedish club Örebro SK for a trial, hoping to secure a transfer.

Rajcomar was released by Breiðablik on 2 February 2009, and signed for Icelandic club KR Reykjavík on 5 February. He signed a two-year contract with KR Reykjavík. Rajcomar was released from his contract with KR before the closing of the transfer window in August 2009.

He was due to go on trial with English League One side Southend United having been recommended to the Essex side, however he missed his flight from Germany to the UK after turning up at the wrong airport and missed out on the opportunity.

Later career
On 7 September 2009, Rajcomar signed a contract with Hungarian outfit Zalaegerszegi TE after missing the opportunity to play in England for Southend United. In his first match for Zalaegerszeg, he caused a sensation by scoring a goal, and being booked with a red card.

He later played for a number of clubs outside the Netherlands, including Patro Eisden Maasmechelen. 

In August 2020, Rajcomar returned to the Netherlands, signing with Tweede Divisie club Kozakken Boys.

International career
Prince was part of the Netherlands squad for the 2005 FIFA World Youth Championship.

In September 2014, Rajcomar was called up for the first time to the senior Curaçaoan national team, to take part at the Caribbean Cup qualification campaign. He scored his first goal on 3 September 2014 against Puerto Rico.

Career statistics
Scores and results list Curaçao's goal tally first, score column indicates score after each Rajcomar goal.

Honours
Utrecht
Johan Cruyff Shield: 2004

References

External links
 Voetbal International profile 
 
 

1985 births
Living people
Footballers from Maastricht
Dutch people of Indian descent
Dutch people of Curaçao descent
Dutch sportspeople of Surinamese descent
Dutch footballers
Curaçao footballers
Association football forwards
Eredivisie players
Eerste Divisie players
Tweede Divisie players
Lierse Kempenzonen players
Liga I players
Nemzeti Bajnokság I players
Belgian Third Division players
Fortuna Sittard players
FC Utrecht players
FC Den Bosch players
Prince Rajcomar
Knattspyrnufélag Reykjavíkur players
Zalaegerszegi TE players
MVV Maastricht players
VVV-Venlo players
Prince Rajcomar
ACS Poli Timișoara players
K. Patro Eisden Maasmechelen players
Kozakken Boys players
Curaçao international footballers
Netherlands under-21 international footballers
Netherlands youth international footballers
2014 Caribbean Cup players
Dutch expatriate footballers
Dutch expatriate sportspeople in Iceland
Expatriate footballers in Iceland
Dutch expatriate sportspeople in Hungary
Expatriate footballers in Hungary
Dutch expatriate sportspeople in Thailand
Expatriate footballers in Thailand
Dutch expatriate sportspeople in Romania
Expatriate footballers in Romania
Dutch expatriate sportspeople in Belgium
Expatriate footballers in Belgium